The Kraus’s giant slender-toed gecko (Nactus fredkrausi) is a species of lizard in the family Gekkonidae. It is endemic to Papua New Guinea.

References

Nactus
Reptiles of Papua New Guinea
Reptiles described in 2020
Endemic fauna of Papua New Guinea
Geckos of New Guinea